The 1972 Men's World Weightlifting Championships were held in Munich, West Germany from August 27 to September 6, 1972. There were 188 men in action from 54 nations.

This tournament was a part of 1972 Summer Olympics but counted as World Weightlifting Championships too. Only total medals counted for Olympic Games while Snatch and Clean & Jerk medals counted for the World Weightlifting Championships.

Medal summary

Medal table
Ranking by Big (Total result) medals 

Ranking by all medals: Big (Total result) and Small (Press, Snatch and Clean & Jerk)

See also
 Weightlifting at the 1972 Summer Olympics

References
Results (Sport 123)
Weightlifting World Championships Seniors Statistics 

World Weightlifting Championships
World Weightlifting Championships
International weightlifting competitions hosted by Germany
1972 in German sport
International sports competitions hosted by West Germany